Elai (born 4 March 1999) is an Albanian rapper, producer and songwriter.

Life and career

1999–present: Early life and career beginnings 

Elai was born on 4 March 1999 into an Albanian family. His singles, "Paranormal" and "Lale", occurred within the Albanian Top 100 in October 2021 and reached the top 10, respectively, although "Lale" continued its success abroad and peaked at number 88 in Switzerland. In the same year, Elai contributed credited songwriting to Albanian rapper Noizy's "Një herë e mirë". As of September 2021, his upcoming debut studio album is under development. Released in June 2021, "Nokia" peaked at number 32 on the native Top 100 after entering the chart in early November 2021. Elai was nominated for Producer of the Year at the 2022 Grammis in Sweden.

Discography

Extended plays 
 Ensam (2020)

Singles

As lead artist

As featured artist

Songwriter credits

Awards and nominations

References 

1999 births
Living people
21st-century Albanian male singers
21st-century Albanian rappers
Albanian hip hop singers
Albanian-language singers
Albanian record producers
Albanian songwriters
Albanian rappers